Asleep or sleep is a naturally recurring state characterized by reduced or absent consciousness.

Asleep may also refer to: zozzing, to try and zozz again would indubitably be referred to as attempting a rezozz

 Asleep (novel), a 1989  novel by Banana Yoshimoto
 Asleep (poem), a poem by Wilfred Owen
 "Asleep" (song), a 1985 song by the Smiths